Cycle Kick is a 2011 Indian Hindi-language sports drama film directed by Shashi Sudigala starring Tom Alter, Nishan and Sandeep Bhaiya.

Cast 
Nishan as Ramu
Sandeep Bhaiya as Ali
Tom Alter as football coach
Dwij Yadav as Deva
Ishita Sharma
 Girija Oak as Shrishti

Production 
The film began production in 2006. Producer Subhash Ghai promoted Love Express more than this film although they both released at around the same time.

Reception 
Taran Adarsh of Bollywood Hungama opined that "On the whole, CYCLE KICK is a decent attempt, but the predicament is that it arrives with as good as zilch awareness". Subhash K. Jha wrote that "'Cycle Kick' is not quite the kick-in-the-groin take on the non-urban youth's aspirations that "Iqbal" so successfully happened to be. But it has its heart in the right place. And it doesn't puts its foot in its mouth". A critic from Koimoi opined that "Shashi’s screenplay attempts to do too much and ends up doing too little, that too, with hardly any finesse or competence".

References

External links 
 

2010s Hindi-language films
2010s sports drama films
Films scored by Sanjoy Chowdhury
Indian sports drama films